Decade are a British rock band from Bath, England. Formed in 2009, the band consists of lead vocalist Alex Sears, guitarist Joe Marriner, guitarist and backing vocalist Connor Fathers and bassist Harry Norton. Encapsulated by the locution 'Loud quiet happy sad', Decade currently have two studio albums, Good Luck and Pleasantries, a self-titled EP as well as an EP they pretend does not exist.

Decade signed to Rude Records in late 2016. Their second studio album, Pleasantries, was released in 2017 to much acclaim across a number of independent publications.

History 

Formed in 2009, Decade operated under the appellation Ready Set Low. This was changed in 2011 shortly after the release of their first EP, Lost at Sea. The band began gaining traction in the UK festival scene, appearing for the first time at Slam Dunk Festival.

Their first studio album, Good Luck, was released in 2014 through Spinefarm Records. That same year, Decade toured with bands such as Deaf Havana, Saves the Day and Mayday Parade, and packed out the room during their appearance at Slam Dunk Festival on the MacBeth Stage across all three dates.

After a substantial break, Decade were welcomed back onto the music circuit with positive reception in 2017 following the release of Pleasantries.<ref>Interview: Decade Interview: Decade Noizze', retrieved 13 September 2017.]</ref> In the same year, they returned to Slam Dunk, Hit the Deck, and toured the UK and Europe with Counterfeit and Tigress.

The band played at the Borderline in London in May 2018, debuting a new song named "Keep Me". However, they have not released any new music since 2017 or played live since 2018, and their Twitter account has been inactive for some time.

 Band members 

 Alex Sears  - vocals
 Joe Marriner - guitar
 Connor Fathers - guitar, vocals
 Harry Norton - bass

Former members
 Dan Clarke - drums (left the band in October 2017)

Live dates in 2018 featured Charlie Pollard from the band Wallflower on drums.

 Discography 

Extended playsLost at Sea (2011) (Released under the band's previous denomination Ready Set Low)Decade (2013) - Spinefarm Records

Studio albumsGood Luck (2014) - Spinefarm RecordsPleasantries (2017) - Rude Records

Singles"The Doctor Called (Turns Out I'm Sick as F**k)"'' (2011)

Tours

2011 

 March - D.R.U.G.S UK Tour w/ Blitz Kids
 May - Set Your Goals UK Tour w/ A Loss For Words and Our Time Down Here
 October - Forever The Sickest Kids UK Tour w/ Glamour Of The Kill and Action Item

2012 

 February - UK Headline Tour 
 May - Hit The Lights UK Tour w/ The Story So Far and Transit
 October/November - A Loss For Words UK Tour w/ Save Your Breath and Light You Up

2013 

 March - UK Headline Tour w/ Light You Up
 April - Don Broco UK Tour w/ Pure Love
 July - Emily's Army (now SWMRS) UK Tour
 October - Tonight Alive UK Tour w/ Set It Off

2014 

 January - Mayday Parade UK/Ireland Tour w/ Man Overboard and Divided By Friday
 April - Saves The Day Europe Tour
 May - UK Headline Tour w/ Only Rivals and Brawlers
 July - Lower Than Atlantis UK Tour w/ Yearbook
 September/October - UK Headline Tour w/ Light You Up and Hey Vanity
 October - We Are The Ocean UK Tour w/ Boy Jumps Ship
 November - A Day To Remember UK Tour w/ Lower Than Atlantis

2015 

 February - The Used UK Tour w/ Landscapes
 April - UK Headline Tour w/ Scouts
 May - Set It Off UK and Europe Tour w/ Brawlers

2016 

 May/June - UK Headline Tour w/ Cheap Meat

2017 

 March - UK Headline Tour w/ Big Spring and Wallflower
 March/April - Counterfeit Europe Tour w/ Tigress
 October - You Me At Six Germany Tour w/ Flash Forward
 November/December - Deaf Havana UK and Germany Tour w/ Blackfoxxes

References

Musical groups established in 2009